Thomas E. Little (March 20, 1949 – August 5, 2010) was an American optometrist from Kinderhook, New York, most widely known as the leader of an International Assistance Mission team that was killed in the 2010 Badakhshan massacre.

Biography
In 1978, Little traveled to Afghanistan. Although only intending to stay there for several months, Little ultimately spent the next 30 years building up the country's eye care services during successive regime changes. 
Little spoke Dari fluently. 

In August 2010, Little's medical team was attacked by masked gunmen in the Kuran wa Munjan District of Badakhshan Province while returning from Nuristan to Kabul. The team had spent two weeks traveling between remote villages on foot and providing medical care. Ten members of the Christian-sponsored team, including six Americans, were murdered. The Taliban took responsibility for the attack. Little's body was found on August 7, 2010.

Little was posthumously awarded the Presidential Medal of Freedom by President Barack Obama on February 15, 2011. He was also posthumously recognized as the 2010 International Optometrist of the Year by the World Council of Optometrists. 

The son of an ophthalmologist, Little attended Ichabod Crane High School in Valatie, New York, where he dated his future wife, Libby. The couple's three daughters were educated at Woodstock School in India.  While most well known for his work in Afghanistan, Little was also an avid outdoorsman, equestrian, and environmentalist.

A documentary about his life directed by Dan Swinton was released in 2014.

References

1949 births
2010 deaths
American optometrists
People from Kinderhook, New York
Deaths by firearm in Afghanistan
Presidential Medal of Freedom recipients